Simon Anholt is an independent policy advisor who has worked to help develop and implement strategies for enhanced economic, political and cultural engagement with other countries.

He is the founder of the Good Country Index.

Anholt has been called the "founder", "champion" and "instigator" of the Nation Brands and Place Brands terms and field of study and practice.

He is the founder and publisher of the global annual research studies: Anholt-Ipsos Nation Brands Index and Anholt-Ipsos Roper City Brands Index, two major surveys which use a panel of 30,000 people in 25 countries to monitor global perceptions of 50 countries and 50 cities.

He is the author of the book Another One Bites The Grass, and of Brand New Justice covering the role of companies in economic development, first published in 2003. His more recent books include the best seller Brand America, (Cyan Books 2004 and 2009); Competitive Identity (Palgrave Macmillan 2007); Places (Palgrave Macmillan 2010); and The Good Country Equation (Berrett-Koehler 2020).

Background

Anholt was born to British parents. The family was based in the Netherlands until Anholt was five, when they moved to Surrey in south-east England. He attended a boarding school and went on to study social anthropology at Oxford. 

After graduation, Anholt worked for advertisers McCann Erickson on international cultural issues, then launched a firm, World Writers, which offered to advertisers first-language cultural adaptation rather than simply translation.

Bibliography 
 Anholt, Simon (2020-08-11). The Good Country Equation: How We Can Repair the World in One Generation. Berrett-Koehler. .

See also 

 Nation branding

References

External links 
 Simon Anholt's views on Brazil's distinctive image and gentle caution to its role as the 2016 Summer Olympics host - Brazil TV interview
 "International public opinion: the sole remaining superpower". Launch of Anholt's Climate Change Communication Forum at COP16, Mexico
 Interview with Simon Anholt on Malaysian radio
 www.simonanholt.com
 

British political consultants
Living people
Year of birth missing (living people)